Pech, Pèch, or PECH may refer to:

People
 Benjamin Pech, an étoile at the Ballet de l'Opéra National de Paris
 Miloš Pech (born 1927), a Czechoslovak sprint canoer
 Samrith Pech, a Cambodian politician

Other uses
 Pech (Dungeons & Dragons), a creature in the Dungeons & Dragons series
 Pech (mythology), a type of gnome-like creatures in Scottish myth
 Pech (novel), a 2002 novel by Joanna Chmielewska
 Pech (river), in Nuristan and Kunar provinces of Afghanistan
 Pech, Ariège, France
 Pech people, an indigenous people in northeastern Honduras
 Pech language, spoken by the people
 Pèch, the Creole name for Perches, Nord-Est, Haiti
 European Parliament Committee on Fisheries (PECH), a committee of the European Parliament

See also 
 Peć, Serbia
 Peche (disambiguation)
 PECHS, one of the neighbourhoods of Jamshed Town in Karachi, Sindh, Pakistan
 
Surnames of Mexican origin

Language and nationality disambiguation pages
Surnames of South Sudanese origin